There is a body of films that feature Frankenstein's monster, first created by Mary Shelley in her 1818 novel Frankenstein; or, The Modern Prometheus.

List of films (chronological)

See also
 Frankenstein in popular culture
 Frankenstein (US miniseries), aired in 2004
 Frankenstein's Wedding, Live in Leeds (BBC3 live broadcast of Colin Teague's 2011 production from Kirkstall Abbey, Leeds).

References

 

Frankenstein's monster, list of films featuring